Scott Anthony Martin (born 1 April 1997) is a Scottish footballer, who plays for Scottish Championship club Hamilton Academical as a midfielder. Martin has previously played for Hibernian, and on loan for Forfar Athletic and Arbroath.

Club career

Hibernian
Raised in Cambuslang and a pupil at Trinity High School, Martin trained with Celtic as a young boy but was released. His mother corresponded with several professional clubs on his behalf, and he joined the youth setup at Hibernian in 2007, following a successful trial.

Having signed a professional contract with the Edinburgh side in February 2014, Martin made his first team debut for Hibs in December of the same year, and made three appearances from the bench in the 2014–15 season. He scored his first goal for the club on 1 August 2015, in a League Cup game against Montrose.

Martin moved on loan to Forfar Athletic in October 2015. On returning to his parent club for the 2016–17 season and made four league appearances as Hibernian won promotion as champions.

Early in his career, he was compared to the Scotland captain Scott Brown, due to similarities in their style of play and the fact that both players came through the Hibernian youth system.

In November 2017, Martin was loaned to a third-tier club again, this time to Arbroath. The Arbroath fans voted Martin as their young player of the year for the 2017–18 season.

Hamilton Academical
On 31 August 2018, Martin signed for Hamilton Academical on a two-year contract. On 3 August 2020, he signed a new three-year deal at Hamilton, keeping him at the club until 2023.

International career
Martin has played for Scotland at under-17 and under-19 international levels.

Career statistics

Notes

Honours
Hibernian:
Scottish Championship: 2016–17

References

External links

Profile at Hibernian official website

1997 births
Living people
Association football midfielders
Scottish footballers
Scottish Professional Football League players
Hibernian F.C. players
Hamilton Academical F.C. players
Footballers from Glasgow
People educated at Trinity High School, Rutherglen
Sportspeople from Cambuslang
Scotland youth international footballers
Forfar Athletic F.C. players
Arbroath F.C. players
Footballers from South Lanarkshire